Cereus, waxy in Latin, may refer to:

 Cereus (anemone), a genus of sea anemones in the family Sagartiidae
 Cereus (plant), a genus of cacti (the family Cactaceae)
 Ceroid cactus, any of a number of cacti with very elongated bodies, including columnar growth cacti and epiphytic cacti
 Aleurocybotus cereus, a whitefly species in the genus Aleurocybotus
 Bacillus cereus, an endemic, soil-dwelling, Gram-positive, rod-shaped, beta hemolytic bacterium species
 Cereus Poker Network, an online poker network

See also
 Cerea (disambiguation)

Genus disambiguation pages